Taunton Press is a publisher of periodicals, books, and websites for the hobbyist and building trades based in Newtown, Connecticut. It was established in 1975 by Paul Roman and his wife Jan.

Publications and Products 
Periodicals published by Taunton Press include:
 Fine Woodworking
 Fine Homebuilding
 Fine Gardening
 Threads
 Kitchen Garden (retired)
 CraftStylish (retired)
 Inspired House (retired)

In addition to traditional print media products, Taunton Press maintains a number of online resources and communities including:

 GreenBuildingAdvisor.com

Taunton Press also publishes books on topics covered in their magazines: woodworking, home building, home design, cooking, gardening and crafts. Popular publications have included Sarah Susanka's Not So Big home design series, New York Times Bestseller The Food You Crave by Ellie Krieger, The Crocheted Prayer Shawl Companion by Janet Bristow and Victoria A. Cole-Galo, Graphic Guide to Frame Construction by Robert Thallon, and Turning Wood with Richard Raffan and Cooking Allergy-Free by Jenna Short. Taunton Press has published for some of the most well-known names in their specialities, such as Tage Frid Teaches Woodworking and the Sam Maloof DVD.

References

External links
Company Homepage

Companies based in Fairfield County, Connecticut
Publishing companies of the United States
Publishing companies established in 1975